Piravash and Piravosh may refer to:
 Piravash-e Olya
 Piravash-e Sofla